Neil Rosenshein (born November 27, 1947 in New York City) is an American operatic tenor, who sang leading tenor roles in the major American and European opera houses. He created the roles of Aspern in Dominick Argento's The Aspern Papers and Léon in Corigliano's The Ghosts of Versailles.

Biography
Following studies in his native city, he made his debut as Count Almaviva in Il barbiere di Siviglia, with Florida Opera in 1972. Noted particularly for his musicianship and abilities as a singing-actor, he went on to appear with the Chicago Lyric Opera, San Francisco Opera, Covent Garden (Lenski in Eugene Onegin, and Števa in Jenůfa), Paris Opéra, Hamburg Opera, The Netherlands Opera, Teatro alla Scala (as Narraboth in Salome, in Robert Wilson's production, 1987), Santa Fe Opera, Dallas Opera (world premiere of The Aspern Papers), and the New Israeli Opera.  In 1992, he appeared in Luca Ronconi's production of La damnation de Faust, in Turin.  He also sang with many of the great orchestras, under Leonard Bernstein, Sir Colin Davis, Seiji Ozawa, James Levine, Nikolaus Harnoncourt, and Riccardo Muti.

Rosenshein made his debut with the Metropolitan Opera in 1987, as Alfredo Germont in La traviata, opposite Diana Soviero and Sherrill Milnes, conducted by Thomas Fulton.  He was also seen there in Die Fledermaus (as Alfred, conducted by Julius Rudel), Salome (as Narraboth), Werther, Faust (with Soviero and James Morris, later Samuel Ramey), the world premiere of The Ghosts of Versailles (with Teresa Stratas, Gino Quilico, and Marilyn Horne), La traviata (conducted by Plácido Domingo), Rusalka (as the Prince), Peter Grimes (conducted by James Conlon), and Die Fledermaus (now as Eisenstein), which was his last performance with the company, in 1999.

The tenor's recordings include Bernstein's Songfest, Die Schöpfung, and Eugene Onegin (with Dame Kiri Te Kanawa and Thomas Hampson, with Nicolai Gedda as M.Triquet, conducted by Sir Charles Mackerras, 1992).  As of 1997, he is on the voice faculty of the Manhattan School of Music. He previously served on the faculty at DePaul University.

Videography 
 Verdi: La traviata [as Gastone] (Sills, H.Price, Fredricks; Rudel, Capobianco, 1976) [live]
 Offenbach: La périchole [as Piquillo] (Ewing, Bacquier, Martinelli, Cassinelli; Soustrout, Savary, 1982) [live]
 Stravinsky: Œdipus rex (Palmer; Haitink, Wich, 1984) [live]
 Corigliano: The Ghosts of Versailles [as Léon] (Stratas, Horne, Hagegård, G.Quilico; Levine, Graham, 1992) [live]

Sources
Cummings, Favid (ed). "Rosenshein, Neil", International Who's Who in Classical Music 2003. Routledge, 2003, p. 673. 
Holland, Bernard, "In Dallas, a Turn on James's 'Aspern Papers'", The New York Times (November 21, 1988)
Metropolitan Opera. Performance archives: Rosenshein, Neil (Tenor). MetOpera Database.
Slonimsky, Nicolas and Kuhn, Laura Diane. "Rosenshein, Neil", Baker's Biographical Dictionary of Musicians Volume 6. Schirmer Books, 2001.

References

External links 
 
  (1988)
 Interview with Neil Rosenshein by Bruce Duffie, January 10, 1990

American operatic tenors
Living people
1947 births
Singers from New York City
Classical musicians from New York (state)
20th-century American male opera singers
Manhattan School of Music faculty
DePaul University faculty